Jørgen Rasmussen (born 19 February 1937) was a Danish footballer.

During his club career he played for Boldklubben 1913. He earned 1 cap for the Denmark national football team, and was in the finals squad for the 1964 European Nations' Cup.

External links
Profile at DBU

1937 births
Living people
Danish men's footballers
Denmark international footballers
1964 European Nations' Cup players
Association football forwards
Boldklubben 1913 players